Rescue are an English five-piece alternative rock-folk band from St Albans, England. They began in 2009 and have toured Hertfordshire and London to much acclaim, including two headline slots at the 2008 UK Music Pub of the Year, The Horn. On 6 February, the band released their debut single "Don't Feel the Rain". The band announced earlier this year that they will be touring again in the summer of 2011.

Band members

Current members
 Ross Bogle – vocals (2008–present)
 David Bogle –  guitar (2008–present)
 Phil Nicholson – bass guitar (2010–present)
 Donald Bogle – saxophone (2008–present)
 Stuart McClinton  – drums (2008–present)

Discography

Singles
 "Don't Feel the Rain" (2011 – Rescue Music Records)

References

External links
Rescue | Listen and Stream Free Music, Albums, New Releases, Photos, Videos

Musical groups established in 2008
English alternative rock groups
British folk rock groups